EtherRock also called EthRock is an early Ethereum based non-fungible token (NFT) project from 2017 that depicts various-colored rocks. There are 100 EtherRocks.

Background
In December 2017, 100 EtherRocks were produced via a smart contract, using artwork taken from a clipart website, and published on the Ethereum blockchain. Only 30 rocks were sold in the first three years of the project's existence.

In the early weeks of August 2021, Gary Vaynerchuk tweeted about EtherRock and the price spiked so much that the $300,000 became the lowest available price for one of the NFTs. Justin Sun has been reported to have bought an EtherRock for $500,000.

Prices continued to rise thereafter. In late August and early September 2021, 3 Etherrocks were sold for $ 2,268,832 (599 Ether), $2,607,584 (790 Ether) and $2,872,733 (888 Ether). Another Etherrock was sold for $1,929,060 (420 Ether). The highest price to date of $3,765,261 (900 Ether) was achieved in October 2021.

In March 2022, a collector by the name of "Dino Dealer" claimed to have accidentally listed an EthRock for 444 WEI ($0.0012 USD) instead of 444 ETH ($1.2M USD), and said that it had been immediately sniped by a bot. The NFT was then relisted at $600,000.

See also
 Rare Pepe
 CryptoPunks
 Bored Ape

References

External links
EtherRock website
EtherRock smart contract

Blockchain and auctions
Ethereum
Non-fungible token
2017 in art
2017 in Internet culture